West Farm(s) may refer to:

West Farms, New Jersey, an unincorporated community
West Farms, Bronx, New York City, a neighborhood
West Farms Square – East Tremont Avenue (IRT White Plains Road Line)
Golden West Farms, a horse racing stable in Canada
West Farms (Litchfield), historic area in Connecticut